Lõunakeskus Ice Hall is an ice arena in Lõunakeskus, Tartu, Estonia.

The hall was opened in 2005.

The hall's capacity is 600.

The hall has an ice arena with dimensions of 30 x 60 m.

The hall is used by two ice hockey clubs: Tartu Välk 494 and HK Kajakas Tartu.

In 2008, the hall was a place for 2008 Estonian Figure Skating Championships.

References

Indoor arenas in Estonia
Sport in Tartu
Indoor ice hockey venues in Estonia
Buildings and structures in Tartu
2005 establishments in Estonia
Sports venues completed in 2005